Thylactus kinduensis is a species of beetle in the family Cerambycidae. It was described by Stephan von Breuning in 1950.

Subspecies
 Thylactus kinduensis kinduensis Breuning, 1950
 Thylactus kinduensis ferreroi Teocchi, 1989

References

Xylorhizini
Beetles described in 1950